Matthew Robert Targett (born 18 September 1995) is a professional footballer who plays as a left back for Premier League club Newcastle United. Targett came through the Southampton academy and was named their Young Player of the Season in 2015 having broken into their Premier League squad that season, he later played on loan at Fulham, playing in their 2018 Championship Play-offs winning side. He has represented both Scotland and England at youth international level.

Club career

Southampton
Born in Eastleigh, Hampshire, Targett joined Southampton's academy at the age of eight, after being scouted by his local team. He was named in a senior matchday squad for the first time on 24 September 2013, and was unused as they defeated Bristol City 2–0 in the third round of the League Cup. On 26 April 2014, he was named in a Premier League game for the first time, remaining on the bench as Southampton won 2–0 at home against Everton.

On 26 August 2014, Targett made his first-team debut for Southampton in a League Cup second-round game at Millwall. He played the entire match, which Southampton won 2–0. His next appearance came on 23 September in a 2–1 victory at Arsenal in the following round of the tournament.

He made his first Premier League appearance on 27 September 2014, replacing Dušan Tadić in added time at the end of a 2–1 home victory over Queens Park Rangers. Targett's first start came on 28 December, a 1–1 draw against Chelsea in which regular left-back Ryan Bertrand was ineligible through being on loan from the visiting team.

He was named as Southampton's Young Player of the Season for 2014–15.

On 4 August 2017, Targett signed a new five-year contract with Southampton, extending his stay at the club to the summer of 2022.

Fulham (loan) 
On 22 January 2018, Targett joined Championship club Fulham on loan for the remainder of the season. He scored his first goal in a 1–1 draw with Bolton Wanderers on 10 February. On 26 May, he won promotion to the Premier League when Fulham beat Aston Villa 1–0 in the Championship Play-off Final, playing the full 90 minutes.

Return to Southampton 
In his penultimate match for the Saints on 27 April 2019, Targett came on at half time for Oriol Romeu and scored his only goal for the club, in a 3–3 home draw with Bournemouth.

Aston Villa
On 1 July 2019, Targett signed for newly-promoted Aston Villa for an undisclosed fee. He made his debut on 27 August in a 6–1 EFL Cup second round victory over Crewe Alexandra, although he was only able to play the first 42 minutes of the game before suffering a hamstring injury.

He recovered and returned to the squad on 25 September, in a 3–1 victory in the next round at Brighton & Hove Albion, and then made his first Premier League start for Villa three days later in a 2–2 home draw against Burnley. Targett scored his first goal for Aston Villa on 19 October, defeating Brighton 2–1 at Villa Park in the fourth minute of added time.

At the end of the 2020–21 season, Targett was the only outfield player to start all 38 Premier League matches, and was voted Players' Player of the Season by his teammates.

Newcastle United 
On 31 January 2022, Targett joined Newcastle United on loan until the end of the 2021–22 season. On 8 June 2022, Targett signed a 4-year deal with the Magpies, for a reported fee of £15 million.

International career
Targett represented Scotland at under-19 level before electing to play for England under-19s in September 2013. On 17 November 2014, Targett scored his first goal at international level in a 1–1 draw against Portugal for the England U-20s, followed by a goal in the penalty shoot-out. Targett made his debut for the under-21 side on 27 March 2015, starting in a 1–0 win against the Czech Republic in Prague.

He was part of the team that won the 2016 Toulon Tournament, their first such win for 22 years.

The Evening Chronicle reported in April 2022 that England and Scotland were both considering Targett for selection by their full national teams.

Career statistics

Honours
Southampton
U21 Premier League Cup: 2014–15

Fulham
EFL Championship play-offs: 2018

Aston Villa
EFL Cup runner-up: 2019–20

Newcastle United
EFL Cup runner-up: 2022–23

England U21
Toulon Tournament: 2016

Individual
Aston Villa Players' Player of the Season: 2020–21

See also
List of sportspeople who competed for more than one nation

References

External links

Southampton F.C. player profile
England profile at the FA

1995 births
Living people
People from Eastleigh
Footballers from Hampshire
English footballers
England youth international footballers
England under-21 international footballers
Scottish footballers
Scotland youth international footballers
Association football defenders
Southampton F.C. players
Fulham F.C. players
Aston Villa F.C. players
Newcastle United F.C. players
Premier League players
English Football League players
English people of Scottish descent